Copernicus Publications (also: Copernicus GmbH) is a publisher of scientific literature based in Göttingen, Germany. Founded in 1994, Copernicus Publications currently publishes 28 peer-reviewed open access scientific journals and other publications on behalf of the European Geosciences Union.

Copernicus Publications is part of the open-access publishing movement. Initially, the CC-BY-NC was used. In 2007, they switched to the CC-BY attribution license. Copernicus Publications has been described as the largest open access publisher in the Geo- and Earth system sciences, and it is known as one of the first publishers to embrace public peer review.

In 2014, one of their journals was terminated under allegations of nepotistic reviewing and malpractice; see Pattern Recognition in Physics#History for details.

See also 
 :Category:Copernicus Publications academic journals
 Open Access Scholarly Publishers Association, of which Copernicus Publications is a founding member
 Open access in Germany

References

External links

 

Academic publishing companies
Publishing companies established in 1994
Open access publishers
1994 establishments in Germany